Walter David Baker,  (August 22, 1930 – November 13, 1983) was a Canadian parliamentarian and lawyer.

Baker is best known for having been Government House Leader during the short-lived minority government of Joe Clark. He received much of the popular blame for the defeat of the government in a Motion of no confidence on December 13, 1979 with the claim that the government fell because "Walter Baker couldn't count". However, observers pointed out that targeting Baker as the scapegoat was unfair as he was House Leader, not Party Whip. The defeat was the result of the Clark government's decision to alienate the six Social Credit Members of Parliament by refusing to accord them official party status as well as Clark's view that he could "govern as if" he had a majority government.

Baker was first elected to the House of Commons of Canada in the 1972 election as the Progressive Conservative Member of Parliament for Grenville—Carleton (later renamed Nepean—Carleton) and was re-elected in the 1974, 1979 and 1980 elections. He served as both Government House Leader and Minister of National Revenue during the Clark government. He served as Opposition House Leader from 1976 to 1979 and again from 1980 to 1981.

In government, Baker introduced the first ever Access to Information Bill which died on the order paper with the Tory government. However, much of Baker's bill became part of the eventual Access to Information Act that was introduced by Liberal Solicitor-General Francis Fox in 1983 and passed by parliament into law. 

He was one of the founding partners of the law firm Bell Baker LLP located in Ottawa, Ontario.

Baker died at the age of 53. A week after his death, a recreational center in Barrhaven, Ottawa, Ontario was named after him, the South Nepean Centre became the Walter Baker Sports Centre.

Electoral record

References

 There goes another one by Pat MacAdam, Ottawa Sun, May 22, 2005

External links
 

1930 births
1983 deaths
Carleton University alumni
Lawyers in Ontario
Members of the 21st Canadian Ministry
Members of the House of Commons of Canada from Ontario
Members of the King's Privy Council for Canada
Progressive Conservative Party of Canada MPs
University of Toronto Faculty of Law alumni